Tankara is one of the 182 Legislative Assembly constituencies of Gujarat state in India. It is part of Morbi district.

List of segments
This assembly seat represents the following segments:

Tankara Taluka
Morbi Taluka (Part) Villages – Mansar, Naranka, Pipaliya, Virparda, Hajnali, Modpar, Lutavadar, Barvala, Khevaliya, Khakhrala, Vanaliya, Khareda, Andarna, Vankda, Pipali, Gor Khijadia, Jepur, Bagathala, Biliya, Kantipur, Manekvada, Nagalpar, Nani Vavdi, Ghuntu, Unchi Mandal, Nichi Mandal, Kalikanagar, Lakhdhirpur, Lalpar, Panchasar, Amrapar Nag, Moti Vavdi, Khanpar, Chanchapar, Thorala, Rajpar, Saktasanala, Jodhpur Nadi, Jambudiya, Paneli, Gidach, Makansar, Adepar, Lakhdhirnagar, Lilapar, Ghunada Sajanpar, Ravapara, Vajepar
Paddhari Taluka – Entire taluka except villages – Khokhri, Jivapar
Lodhika Taluka (Part) Village – Und Khijadiya
Dhrol Taluka (Part) of Jamnagar District Villages – Chhalla, Golita

Members of Legislative Assembly

Election results

2022

2014 by-poll

2012

See also
 List of constituencies of the Gujarat Legislative Assembly
 Morbi district

References

External links
 

Assembly constituencies of Gujarat
Morbi district